Brebner is a surname, and may refer to:

 Dominique Brebner or Dominique Jackson (model), Tobagonian-American transgender actor and model.
 Grant Brebner (born 1977) is a Scottish football player and manager.
 Morwyn Brebner, Canadian playwright, television writer and producer.
 Ronald Brebner (1881–1914), English amateur football player.